Commander Evans may refer to:
Ernest E. Evans, commander of USN destroyer USS Johnston (DD-557) 
Edward Evans, 1st Baron Mountevans, 
Samuel Evans (naval officer), commander of USS Hornet (1805 sloop)